Cultural identity refers to a person's sense of belonging to a particular culture or group.  This process involves learning about and accepting traditions, heritage, language, religion, ancestry, aesthetics, thinking patterns, and social structures of a culture.  Normally, people internalize the beliefs, values, norms, and social practices of their culture and identify themselves with that culture.  The culture becomes a part of their self-concept.  However, some studies have noted that existing cultural identity theory may not account for the fact that different individuals and groups may not react to or interpret events, happenings, attitudes, etc. in the same ways as other individuals or groups.

Myron Lustig notes that cultural identities are central to a person's sense of self.  That is because cultural identities “are central, dynamic, and multifaceted components of one’s self concept”.  Lustig also points out that cultural identities are dynamic, and they exist within a changing social context.  As a result, a person's identity changes as do one's ongoing experiences in life.  Other researchers describe cultural identity as referring to the content of values as guiding principles, to meaningful symbols, and to life styles that individuals share with others, though not necessarily within recognizable groups.  In addition, Boski et al. point out that most books and studies have ignored cultural identity as a theoretical construct in the field of cross-cultural psychology.  Instead, books and journals report works on the theme of social identity.  Social identity is described as a sense of “We-ness,” or attachment to a group that one is a member of, and by comparison to others.  The sense of “We-ness” remains culturally empty, however.  Even with natural groups, it is portrayed in trait-attributes, “which is not different from those used to characterize individuals”.  There is, however, research evidence about the social (ethnic) vs. cultural distinction.  This study found that the task-oriented cultural style was generally more favored than the task-plus interpersonal alternative, particularly among Anglo-American participants, for whom ethnicity did not matter.  Mexican and Latino participants, however, showed some degree of favoritism toward ethnically similar participants.

It seems that there are different viewpoints regarding cultural and social identities.  Cultural identity is defined as the identity of a group or culture or of an individual as far as one is influenced by one's belonging to a group or culture.  Further, Cultural identity is similar to, and overlaps with, identity politics.  New forms of identification have been suggested to break down the understanding of the individual as a whole subject into a collection of various cultural identifiers.  Such identifiers can result from various conditions including: location, gender, race, history, nationality, language, sexuality, religious beliefs, ethnicity, aesthetics, and even food.  In places like the U.S. and Canada, where the people are ethnically diverse, social unity is primarily based on common social values and beliefs.  However, some critics of cultural identity declare that cultural identity based upon difference is a divisive force in society.  In addition, cultural identity may be defined by the social network of people imitating and following the social norms as presented by the media.  Therefore, instead of learning behavior and knowledge from cultural or religious groups, people may be learning social norms from the media to build on their cultural identity.  Language may also be an important factor in culture identity.  The communication that comes with sharing a language promotes connections and roots to ancestors and cultural histories.

	When young people are severed from the ideals and positively sanctioned statuses, feelings of alienation or social isolation may develop.  These feelings can result in undesired treatment and status.  This process results in personal marginalization, and it may lead to social marginalization which includes that person's relative economic, employment, educational, and cultural loss compared to those around him.  This provides a second source of alienation from mainstream society.  This can cause an individual to experience extreme discomfort called ego identity discomfort.  Because external sources have too much control, the individual cannot construct a personal definition of him/her self.  The person is then motivated to identify with an alternative social group such as a drug subcultural group.  Such groups provide opportunities to resolve identity problems.   Identification with such a group reduces the person's ego identity discomfort, or it helps to solve identity problems.  Scholars today are focusing on the basic elements of social organization (race, ethnicity, gender, and social class) in their theory and research.  In the case of drug subcultures, it is reported that Anderson (1998) discovered that the composition of the drug subcultural groups differed between blacks and whites.  Blacks described neighborhood and school based groups as securing an improved social status and reputation.  On the other hand, Anderson (1998) found that the drug subcultural groups reported by whites differed.  These groups were located at nightclubs, bars, colleges, high schools and around the neighborhood.  Some of these groups were “other” activity oriented, such as college groups or the entertainment industry, and these groups had a “very strong” interest in drugs.  Whites reported using many different drugs, from alcohol and cocaine to marijuana and heroin.

References

Further reading
 Groh, A. (2019). Theories of Culture. London: Routledge. 
 Theories of Identity. (2012). Retrieved Feb. 28, 2012.

Anthropology
Cultural geography
Identity politics
Sociology of culture